Normangee High School is a 2A public high school located in Normangee, Texas (USA). It is part of the Normangee Independent School District located in southwest Leon County. In 2011, the school was rated "Academically Acceptable" by the Texas Education Agency.

Athletics
The Normangee Panthers compete in the following sports:

Baseball
Basketball
Football
Golf
Powerlifting
Softball
Tennis
Track and Field
Volleyball

State Titles
Boys Basketball - 
2004(1A/D1)^

^Also won Texas Cup

References

External links
Normangee ISD

Public high schools in Texas
Schools in Leon County, Texas